Blitz is the 11th studio album of French singer Étienne Daho, released on November 17, 2017.

Background
The psychedelically-inspired album was written and recorded in London, with the "Blitz" of the title referring the city's climate after the Brexit vote and terrorist attacks. In addition to long-time collaborators Fabien Waltmann and Jean-Louis Piérot, Daho recorded with musicians from The Unloved (composer/producers David Holmes and Keefus Ciancia and singer Jade Vincent), whom he had met upon the release of their first album.

Themes
The album's touchpoints are both personal and public: "Le jardin" (The Garden) is a tribute to his sister Jeanne, who died in 2016, while "Chambre 29" (Room 29) is dedicated to Pink Floyd founder Syd Barrett. "Les flocons de l'été" (The Flakes of Summer) evokes the month of August 2013, which Daho spent in a hospital room, nearly dying of peritonitis. The album's cover photo, where he appears dressed in leather and cap, surrounded by scrolls of smoke, was inspired by the Marlon Brando's performance in The Wild One and Charlotte Rampling in The Night Porter.

References 

Étienne Daho albums
2017 albums